Paul Wilson may refer to:

Sports
Paul Wilson (baseball) (born 1973), pitcher in Major League Baseball
Paul Wilson (cricketer) (born 1972), Australian cricketer and umpire
Paul Wilson (decathlete), New Zealand decathlete, see national champions decathlon
Paul Wilson (footballer, born 1950) (1950–2017), Scotland international footballer
Paul Wilson (footballer, born 1968), English former footballer
Paul Wilson (footballer, born 1977), English former footballer for Gillingham
Paul Wilson (Jamaican footballer) (born 1993), Jamaican footballer
Paul Wilson (pole vaulter) (born 1947), American; former pole vault world record holder
Paul Wilson (sailor), winner of the 2010 Clifford Day Mallory Cup

Musicians
Paul Wilson (musician) (born 1978), bassist for the rock band Snow Patrol
Paul David Wilson (born 1952), American songwriter, composer, conductor, and music producer
Paul Wilson (music theorist), American music theorist and professor
Paul Wilson, Canadian guitarist and vocalist, member of The Plastic People of the Universe in 1970–1972
Paul Wilson, original baritone vocalist from The Flamingos
Paul Wilson, member of the Absolute (production team) and songwriter

Others
F. Paul Wilson (born 1946), American science fiction and horror author
R. Paul Wilson, sleight of hand expert
Paul Wilson, Baron Wilson of High Wray (1908–1980), British engineer, Lord Lieutenant, governor of the BBC
Paul Wilson (criminologist) (born 1941), Australian criminologist
Paul Wilson (meditation teacher), author of The Little Book of Calm, The Quiet, etc.
Paul Wilson (nuclear engineer) (born 1971), Professor of nuclear engineering
Paul Wilson (translator) (born 1941), Canadian translator and writer
Paul C. Wilson (born 1961), judge of the Supreme Court of Missouri
Paul Graham Wilson (born 1928), Australian botanist
Paul Wilson (special effects) (born 1954), see 52nd Academy Awards
Paul Wilson (palaeoclimatologist), a British climate scientist known for his extensive deep-time palaeoclimate work with the Integrated Ocean Drilling Program

See also 
Paul Willson (born 1945), American actor